Giovenale Boetto was a Piedmontese fresco painter who flourished at Turin, Italy from 1642 to 1682. He was principally employed in embellishing the palaces and public edifices at Turin with allegorical subjects. Among his works are twelve frescoes in the Casa Garballi representing subjects emblematical of the Arts and Sciences. Luigi Lanzi affirms that he excelled as an engraver.

References
 

Year of birth unknown
Year of death unknown
Italian Baroque painters
17th-century Italian painters
Italian male painters
Painters from Turin